Calum Thomas Hood (born 25 January 1996) is an Australian musician, known for being the bassist and the vocalist of the pop rock band 5 Seconds of Summer. Since 2014, 5 Seconds of Summer have sold more than 10 million albums, sold over two million concert tickets worldwide, and the band's songs streams surpass seven billion, making them one of the most successful Australian musical exports in history.

Early life 
Calum Thomas Hood was born on 25 January 1996 and raised in Mount Druitt, New South Wales.  His father, David Hood, is a former Coca-Cola employee, while his mother, Joy Hood, worked in the superannuation industry. Through his father he claims Scottish descent, and through his mother he claims Cook Island Māori descent. Hood is the younger brother of singer-songwriter, Mali-Koa. Hood recalls his childhood upbringing to be "middle-class" and "not the most glamorous life". Hood attended Norwest Primary School where he befriended future band-mate Michael Clifford in the third grade. For his high-school education, Hood attended Norwest Christian College where he befriended future band-mate Luke Hemmings in Year 7 after they performed a Secondhand Serenade cover at a school talent show.

Throughout his childhood and early teenage years, Hood took a keen interest in sports, particularly football (soccer), which he had a "promising future" in and visited a Brazil training camp for, in order to pursue the sport as a career. However, after the formation of the band and due to the band's move to London in late 2012, he ultimately decided to stop playing football to instead pursue music. Hood later recalled that after quitting football, "there was a period of a month where my parents thought I was making the worst decision of my life. My mum threw out all the clothes in my closet. And I left [...] just being like, I made one of the biggest decisions. But now it's worked out". Following his decision to quit playing football, he dropped out of high-school in 2012 after completing Year 11.

Career 
In 2011, Hood, Clifford and Hemmings began posting song covers on Hemmings' Youtube channel. The trio eventually added mutual friend Ashton Irwin to their videos, forming the current 5 Seconds of Summer lineup.  After months of posting song covers together, the band began attracting interest from major music labels and publishers and signed a publishing deal with Sony/ATV Music Publishing. Hood has since released five studio albums with the band: 5 Seconds of Summer (2014), Sounds Good Feels Good (2015), Youngblood (2018), Calm (2020) and 5SOS5 (2022).

Apart from the band, Hood has co-written songs for other artists, including the Black Veil Brides and Makeout.

Personal life 
In 2017, it was reported that Hood bought a house, previously owned by Richie Kotzen, in the Hollywood Hills neighborhood of Los Angeles.  As of 2020, Hood's net-worth is estimated to be $25 million (USD).

Discography

Song credits

References

External links

1996 births
Living people
Australian rock bass guitarists
Male bass guitarists
Australian people of Scottish descent
Australian people of Māori descent
Australian male singer-songwriters